Johanna Maria Frisk (born 19 March 1986) is a Swedish former football defender who played for Tyresö FF of the Damallsvenskan for four seasons prior to her retirement in January 2014. She previously played for Umeå IK and in the United States for Los Angeles Sol of Women's Professional Soccer (WPS). Frisk made three appearances for the senior Sweden women's national football team.

Tyresö won the Damallsvenskan title for the first time in the 2012 season and Frisk collected her fourth league winner's medal, in addition to three won with Umeå. She was the team captain, but missed five months of the title-winning season with a meniscus injury. In January 2014, Frisk announced her retirement from football after she failed to overcome another serious knee injury.

References

External links 
 WPS player profile (archived)
  

Los Angeles Sol players
Umeå IK players
Swedish women's footballers
1986 births
Living people
Sweden women's international footballers
Women's Professional Soccer players
Tyresö FF players
Damallsvenskan players
Bälinge IF players
Expatriate women's soccer players in the United States
Swedish expatriate women's footballers
Swedish expatriate sportspeople in the United States
Women's association football defenders